Hajjilar Qaleh (also Romanized as Ḩājjīlar Qal‘eh) is a village in Fajr Rural District, in the Central District of Gonbad-e Qabus County, Golestan Province, Iran. At the 2006 census, its population was 2,267, in 497 families.

References 

Populated places in Gonbad-e Kavus County